Scott Barnes may refer to:

 Scott Barnes (athletic director) (born 1962), American athletic director
 Scott Barnes (baseball) (born 1987), American professional baseball player
 Scottie Barnes (born 2001), American basketball player